"Get Ur Freak On" is a song by American rapper Missy Elliott. It was written and produced by Elliott and Timbaland for her third studio album Miss E... So Addictive (2001). Based on heavy bhangra elements, a popular music and dance form from the region of Punjab in South Asia, the song features a six-note base that is a Punjabi melody played on a tumbi and rhythm and bassline played on tabla.

Released as the album's first single on March 13, 2001, the track reached number seven on the US Billboard Hot 100 chart. Internationally, "Get Ur Freak On" became a top ten success in the Netherlands and the United Kingdom, where it became her first solo top ten hit, peaking at number four. A remix of the song featuring Nelly Furtado was a dance club hit during this period, and was used both in the soundtrack and in the background of the movie Lara Croft: Tomb Raider (2001) starring Angelina Jolie. The song is also heard in The Rundown (2003) starring Dwayne Johnson (remixed with AC/DC's "Back in Black") and The 40-Year-Old Virgin (2005) starring Steve Carell.

In 2011, the song was listed 14th on Rolling Stone Best Songs of the 2000s. In 2004 and 2010, it was ranked at number 466 on their 500 Greatest Songs of All Time. In the 2021 reranking, it was ranked at number eight. In 2002, "Get Ur Freak On" was named the best single released in the year 2001 by The Village Voices Pazz & Jop annual year-end critics' poll. The song also lists at number seven on Pitchfork Media's Top 500 Songs of the 2000s and number 16 on VH1's Greatest Songs of Hip-Hop. In 2011, NME placed it at number 17 on its list "150 Best Tracks of the Past 15 Years". In April 2014, the song was remixed with the Black Keys' song "Keep Me" for the original soundtrack to Neighbors (2014). It was heard once in the TV spots for Goosebumps 2: Haunted Halloween.

On the Billboard magazine issue dated February 21, 2015, "Get Ur Freak On" re-entered at number 40, more than a decade after its original chart run. This re-entry was spawned by Missy Elliott's performance at the Super Bowl XLIX halftime show that occurred earlier in the month.

Background
At the beginning of the song, a man says in Japanese: 「これからみんなでめちゃくちゃ踊って騒ごう、騒ごう。」 "Kore kara minna de mechakucha odotte. Sawagou, sawagou". Translated into English, it means: "Everyone start dancing together wildly now. Let's make some noise, let's make some noise." Before the second chorus (after Missy says "Let me throw you some"), the song samples German artist Karunesh’s song “Solitude” from the album Global Spirit. The outro of the song features the man who speaks Japanese saying "Ichi, ni, san, shi", translating to "One, two, three, four."

The music video was directed by Dave Meyers. Rappers Ludacris, LL Cool J, Timbaland, Ja Rule, Busta Rhymes, Master P, Spliff Star, Lil' Romeo, Eve, Nate Dogg and singer Nicole Wray make cameo appearances in the video.

This tune was also utilized in Bubba Sparxxx's debut single "Ugly", in whose video Elliott makes a cameo.

Track listings
 

US 12-inch single
A1. "Get Ur Freak On" (album version) – 3:57
A2. "Get Ur Freak On" (amended version) – 3:57
B1. "Get Ur Freak On" (instrumental) – 3:53
B2. "Get Ur Freak On" (a cappella) – 3:10
B3. "Get Ur Freak On" (TV track) – 3:58

UK 12-inch single
A1. "Get Ur Freak On" (edit) – 3:31
A2. "Get Ur Freak On" (album version) – 3:57
B1. "Get Ur Freak On" (instrumental) – 3:53
B2. "Get Ur Freak On" (a cappella) – 3:11
B3. "Get Ur Freak On" (TV track) – 3:50

UK CD single
 "Get Ur Freak On" (edit) – 3:31
 "Get Ur Freak On" (amended version) – 3:57
 "Get Ur Freak On" (instrumental) – 3:53

UK cassette single and European CD single
 "Get Ur Freak On" (edit) – 3:31
 "Get Ur Freak On" (album version) – 3:57

Australian CD single
 "Get Ur Freak On" (edit) – 3:31
 "Get Ur Freak On" (radio edit—Bastone & Bernstien club mix) – 3:27
 "Get Ur Freak On" (amended version) – 3:57
 "Get Ur Freak On" (instrumental) – 3:53

Charts and certifications

Weekly charts

Year-end charts

Certifications

Release history

Cover versions
In 2005, Scottish acoustic rocker KT Tunstall released her version of "Get Ur Freak On" performed for BBC Radio Live Lounge on certain versions of the single for "Suddenly I See".

Anda Adam's single "Nai, Nai" from her debut album Confidențial (2005) samples the Elliot's track.

Shawn Lee's Ping Pong Orchestra released a surf rock rendition on the 2007 album "Hits the Hits."

American rock band Eels also released a version of "Get Ur Freak On" on Meet the Eels: Essential Eels Vol. I, having frequently performed it live during the Shootenanny! tour several years previously.

On the comedy show Fonejacker, the track was parodied by Kayvan Novak as he tried to get "Sounds of the Universe" record shop manager Jon Burnip, to identify the track by singing the tune with nonsensical lyrics.

In Britney Spears' Britney: Piece of Me revamped Vegas residency show, "Get Ur Freak On" was performed as a medley along with other Elliott songs.

Though not covered, the melody of the song was sampled in the song “ILoveYourAunt” by American rappers A$AP Ferg and $ki Mask the Slump God.

Japanese experimental music group Satanicpornocultshop sampled lyrics from "Get Ur Freak On" in their 2010 song "[r.i.p.] Tide."

Elliot's "Get Ur Freak On" is sampled of Memphis Bleek feat. Jay-Z. Twista and Missy Elliot's "Is That Your Chick (The Lost Verses)".

References

2001 singles
2001 songs
Bhangra (music) songs
Elektra Records singles
Grammy Award for Best Rap Solo Performance
Missy Elliott songs
Song recordings produced by Timbaland
Songs written by Missy Elliott
Songs written by Timbaland
Music videos directed by Dave Meyers (director)